Bina Daigeler is a German costume designer. She was nominated for an Academy Award in the category Best Costume Design for the fantasy drama period film Mulan.

Selected filmography 
 All About My Mother (1999)
 Volver (2006)
 Only Lovers Left Alive (2013)
 Out of the Dark (2014)
 Hitman: Agent 47 (2015)
 Manifesto (2015)
 Hands of Stone (2016)
 Snowden (2016)
 The Zookeeper's Wife (2017)
 Submergence (2017)
 Entebbe (2018)
 Dumplin' (2018)
 Mulan (2020)
 Tár (2022)

References

External links 

Living people
Place of birth missing (living people)
Year of birth missing (living people)
German emigrants to the United States
German costume designers
Women costume designers